The 2010–11 Iona Gaels men's basketball team represented Iona College during the 2010–11 NCAA Division I men's basketball season. The Gaels, led by first year head coach Tim Cluess, played their home games at Hynes Athletics Center and are members of the Metro Atlantic Athletic Conference. They finished the season 25–12, 13–5 in MAAC and lost in the championship game of the 2011 MAAC men's basketball tournament to Saint Peter's. They were invited to the 2011 CollegeInsider.com Tournament where they advanced to the championship game before falling to Santa Clara.

Roster

Schedule
 
|-
!colspan=9 style=|Regular season

|-
!colspan=9 style=|MAAC tournament

|-
!colspan=9 style=|CollegeInsider.com tournament

References

Iona
Iona
Iona Gaels men's basketball seasons